The Liga M3 is the third level of the football league competition in Malaysia. Contested by 14 clubs, it operates on a system of promotion and relegation with the Liga Premier and Liga M4. The league was created in 2018 as part of Malaysian Football League plan to reformed Malaysian football league structure.

History 

In 2018, Liga M3 was supposed to form the fourth division of Malaysian football league, however after Football association of Malaysia confirmed a reformed Liga FAM as a knock-out competition, the league was announce as a replacement to form the third division of Malaysian League.

After a rebranding of Malaysian Football League (MFL) in March 2018, the company has announced a reform lower league competition in Malaysia. In 2019, a new subsidiary of the company was formed as Amateur Football League (AFL) which will be tasked to manage the third division and below. The AFL has officially confirmed the formation of Liga M3 and Liga M4 as the third and fourth division of Malaysian League as an amateur league competition. 

A total 14 clubs has been confirmed to compete for the inaugural season of newly reformed third division, Liga M3 which replaced the former Liga FAM. While the states level competition will run in parallel and formed the Liga M4. The a qualified champion from 5 FA State League and 10 Social League teams are from the inaugural 2018 season was promoted to Liga M3.

See also 
 Liga Semi-Pro
 Liga Premier
 Liga Super
 Piala FA
 Piala Malaysia
 FAM Football Awards

References

External links 
 

History of football in Malaysia
3